A stabilized liquid membrane device or SLMD is a type of passive sampling device which allows for the in situ, integrative collection of waterborne, labile ionic metal contaminants. By capturing and sequestering metal ions onto its surface continuously over a period of days to weeks, an SLMD can provide an integrative measurement of bioavailable toxic metal ions present in the aqueous environment.<ref
    name=a5>Petty, J.D., Brumbaugh, W.G., Huckins, T.W.M., Wiedmeyer, R. 2001. US Patent No. US006296760B1.
    https://patents.google.com/patent/US6296760?oq=ininventor:Petty+ininventor:Brumbaugh+ininventor:Huckins+ininventor:Wiedmeyer
</ref> As such, they have been used in conjunction with other passive samplers in ecological field studies.

Background 
Passive samplers were first developed in the early 1970s to monitor concentrations of airborne contaminants industrial workers might be exposed to, but by the 1990s researchers had developed and utilized passive samplers to monitor contaminants in the aqueous environment. The first type of passive sampler made for use in the aqueous environment was the semipermeable membrane device (SPMD). SPMDs could be used to determine time-weighted average concentrations of hydrophobic organic contaminants, but until the early 2000s passive sampling devices for metal contaminants had not yet emerged.
Metals in the environment can speciate into different forms. Most metals dissolved in the aqueous environment are present as any of several ionic, complex-ion, and organically bound states. For most toxic metals, bioavailability is greatest for labile metals in their free ionic state. Recognizing the potential usefulness of a passive sampling device that could be used to measure trace amounts of bioavailable toxic metals, researchers at the United States Geological Survey (USGS) and University of Missouri began development on a counterpart to SPMDs that could be used to sample for labile metals.

Structure and function 
The outer portion of a SLMD consists of a section of sealed, flat, semi-permeable polyethylene tubing. Sealed inside this tubing is a 1:1 mixture of a hydrophobic metal complexing agent and a long chain organic acid. The organic acid diffuses through the tubing to the outer surface, where the carboxylic acid portion can form stable complexes with calcium and magnesium ions in the water. This allows a waxy layer to slowly accumulate on the outside of the tube. the metal complexing agent continuously mobilizes into this waxy layer, where it can sequester metal ions from the water. The hydrophobic metal complexing agent most commonly used in SLMDs is an alkylated 8-hydroxyquinoline. Oleic acid is commonly used as the other half of the 1:1 hydrophobic reagent mixture, as it readily forms calcium oleates in the aqueous sampling media. In addition to the base device, hydrophobic plastic sheaths are sometimes used to house SLMDs in the field. Variable water flow can alter the sampling rates of metals by SLMDs, making a time-averaged concentration difficult to determine. By allowing liable metal analytes to diffuse to the SLMD's surface while limiting the diffusion of particulate, colloidal, or humic substances, these hydrophobic sheaths help reduce variability of SLMD uptake in faster moving waters.

After being deployed for a known time interval, SLMDs can be recovered from the field for analysis. Washing with 20% nitric acid allows for the extraction of accumulated metals, and by using analytical techniques like inductively coupled plasma mass spectroscopy (ICP-MS) or atomic absorption spectroscopy (flame AAS)  to measure the concentration of metal in the extract, the amount of metal accumulated by the SLMD can be determined.

Applications 
SLMDs are known to accumulate cadmium, cobalt, copper, nickel, lead, and zinc, and have been deployed in freshwater monitoring studies by The Washington State Department of Ecology (Ecology) and the USGS.
Ecology deployed SLMDs in upper and lower Indian Creek for 28 and 27 days respectively. Metal concentrations on the SLMDs were used to estimate the true concentration of metals in the creek. The estimated concentration was expressed as a range based on sampling rate of SLMDs as well as the length of exposure. The purpose of the sampling was to investigate potential causes of sublethal effects of young trout and loss of benthic biodiversity in the creek.

Advantages and limitations 
Toxic metals can be present in the aqueous environment at trace or ultra-trace concentrations, yet still be toxicologically significant and thus cause harm to humans or the environment. Because these concentrations are so low, they would fall beyond the detection limits of most analytical instruments if the media had been sampled using traditional grab samples. Using SLMDs to passively collect metals over an extended period of time allows for trace metals to accumulate to detectable levels, which can give more accurate estimate of aquatic chemistry and contamination. SLMDs also have the advantage of being able to capture pulses of metal contamination that might otherwise go undetected when using grab samples.
SLMDs are limited to the assessment of labile metals, and cannot be used to monitor for organic contaminants. Further, while the ability of SLMDs to sample copper, zinc, nickel, lead, and cadmium has been repeatedly demonstrated, there has been little laboratory research on their ability to reliably uptake other toxic metals. Still, while laboratory studies on the effectiveness of SLMDs have only investigated copper, zinc, nickel, lead, and cadmium, SLMDs have been used with success in field studies to assess a wider range of metals.

See also 

 Semipermeable membrane devices
 Polar organic chemical integrative sampler
 Diffusive gradients in thin films
 Chemcatcher

References 

Environmental monitoring
Environmental science
Analytical chemistry